Arthur Bruce Williams (January 27, 1872 – May 1, 1925) was a politician from the U.S. state of Michigan.

Biography
Williams was born in Ashland, Ohio on January 27, 1872, and attended the common schools of Eaton County, Michigan.  He graduated from Olivet College, in 1892, studied law with John M. C. Smith, attained admission to the bar in 1894, and commenced practice in Battle Creek.  He was interested in agricultural pursuits at his summer home in Gull Lake.  He served as director of the Old National Bank in Battle Creek, and also as vice president and general counsel of the Postum Cereal Company.  He also served as president of the Michigan Manufacturers' Association.

On June 19, 1923, Williams was elected as a Republican from Michigan's 3rd congressional district to the 68th United States Congress to fill the vacancy caused by the death of John M. C. Smith.  In 1924 he was re-elected to the 69th Congress and served until his death in Baltimore, Maryland.  He was interred in Maple Hill Cemetery in Charlotte, Michigan.

See also
List of United States Congress members who died in office (1900–49)

References

Sources

Books

External links

Arthur B. Williams at The Political Graveyard

1872 births
1925 deaths
People from Ashland, Ohio
Republican Party members of the United States House of Representatives from Michigan
Olivet College alumni
People from Battle Creek, Michigan